Edlington with Wispington is a civil parish  in the East Lindsey district of Lincolnshire, England.

In the 2001 Census the parish population was recorded as 147, reducing to 134 at the 2011 Census.

The Parish contains the two hamlets of Edlington and Wispington. Local democracy is handled by a parish meeting.

The civil parish was created in 1931, by merging the two former parishes of Edlington and Wisperton.

Places in the parish
Edlington with Wispington today comprises:

Settlements
Edlington  
Wispington

Other locations
Edlington  Former medieval village of Edlington, recorded from Sunken road and house bases.

References

External links

Civil parishes in Lincolnshire
East Lindsey District